Mike McGowan (born 15 July 1947) is a Scottish footballer, who played for Celtic, Dumbarton and Hamilton. Now living on South Africa after playing for several South African clubs. He now teaches football at a local school.

References

1947 births
Scottish footballers
Celtic F.C. players
Dumbarton F.C. players
Hamilton Academical F.C. players
Scottish Football League players
Living people
Ballymena United F.C. players
Association football inside forwards
Scottish expatriates in South Africa
Expatriate soccer players in South Africa